Brucerolis brandtae is a species of isopods in the family Serolidae, found in the Southern Ocean in the waters around New Zealand.

The species was first described in 2009 by Gary Poore and Melissa Storey, and the genus name honours Niel L. Bruce.

External links 

Sphaeromatidea